Todo modo (also known as One Way or Another) is a 1976 Italian drama film directed by Elio Petri. Loosely based on the novel of the same name by Leonardo Sciascia, it is the last of the cinematographic, but also political and ideological union of the director Elio Petri and the actor Gian Maria Volonté, a partnership that contributed to the success of Italian political cinema of the seventies. It represents the portrait of the deviant men of power of the Christian Democrats. The premiere of the film was 30 April 1976.

Made in the same period of Illustrious corpses (1976) by Francesco Rosi, also inspired by a work by Sciascia, Todo modo contributes to the efforts of Italian cinema in questioning the political future of a country in crisis. In 2014 the film was restored thanks to the work of the Bologna Film Library and the National Cinema Museum of Turin.

Plot
I forced Sciascia's hands even in the tone of the film...and so it seemed to me, not only to follow an indication from Sciascia, but to evoke that climate of very black farce that one breathed and still continues to breathe in Italy.
—Elio Petri, 1979

During a mysterious epidemic that claims numerous political leaders, big industrialists, bankers, and business leaders of the ruling party, the Christian Democrats arrive in a hotel/hermitage/prison called Zafer. They gather for an annual three-day retreat (inspired by the Spiritual Exercises of Ignatius of Loyola) to atone for their past crimes of corruption and unethical practices. These exercises are practiced under the guidance of the unusual Don Gaetano (Marcello Mastroianni), a very influential but corrupt priest, who dominates all those at the retreat.

The retreat acts as a sort of renewal of the party's structure, leaders, and interests in order to maintain power in the country. Between constant violent quarrels, mutual accusations, and little actual spiritual practice, a series of crimes develop that eliminate the leading figures of the party one by one.

Cast
 Gian Maria Volonté as M.
 Marcello Mastroianni as Don Gaetano
 Mariangela Melato as Giacinta, M.'s wife
 Ciccio Ingrassia as Voltrano
 Franco Citti as M.'s driver
 Tino Scotti as the cook
 Renato Salvatori as Dr. Scalambri
 Michel Piccoli as He
 Cesare Gelli as Arras, Vice Commissioner

Production
The character of the President openly resembles Aldo Moro (who, at the time of the film's release, had been the head of the Italian government for two years). In the film, he is a conciliatory, good-natured leader who tries to please everyone but secretly hungers for power and domination. Moro isn't ever mentioned directly; but the President's physical appearance and behavior are similar.

Volonté closely studied Moro's speeches and learned to imitate his facial and body language as well as the inflections of his voice when speaking in a conciliatory tone. Petri recalled that the first two days of filming were discarded by mutual agreement because the resemblance between the two "was so embarrassing, you felt it in the pit of your stomach." Petri and Volonte decided that he did not have to imitate Moro exactly, but to provide him with a mask, like a caricature. Petri also realized that if the character had been explicitly Aldo Moro, the film would never have been distributed.

Among the other actors involved in the film is Marcello Mastroianni in the role of Don Gaetano, a shrewd and calculating priest who is very influential in politics and also thirsty for power.

References

External links

1976 films
1976 comedy films
1976 drama films
1976 comedy-drama films
Italian black comedy films
Films about politicians
Films based on Italian novels
Films based on works by Leonardo Sciascia
Films critical of the Catholic Church
Films scored by Ennio Morricone
Films directed by Elio Petri
Italian comedy-drama films
1970s Italian-language films
Italian political satire films
Films à clef
Depictions of Aldo Moro on film
1970s Italian films